Vectrus is an American defense contractor. They are one of the largest federal contractors.

Overview
Vectrus is a defense contractor based in Colorado Springs, Colorado. Vectrus is publicly traded and is listed on the New York Stock Exchange.

History
Vectrus was spun off from Exelis Inc. in 2014. Exelis itself was spun off from ITT Corp. in 2011.

In 2019, they won a $1.38 billion US Army contract to provide logistical service in the Middle East and Asia.

Leadership
Chuck Prow is the chief executive officer of Vectrus.

References

Companies based in Colorado Springs, Colorado